The Leopard Lady is a 1928 American silent horror film directed by Rupert Julian, written by Beulah Marie Dix, and starring Jacqueline Logan, Alan Hale and Robert Armstrong. The film, based on a play by Edward Childs Carpenter, is about a female animal trainer named Paula who goes undercover at a circus that has been beset by a number of unexplained horrific murders. A gorilla trained to kill people turns out to be the culprit, the simian being played by Charles Gemora (who made a career of playing apes in horror films, including 1932's Murders in the Rue Morgue). The cast boasted several name stars who went on to long acting careers, including Alan Hale, Robert Armstrong, and Richard Alexander (who appeared in numerous B-Westerns and serials). Rupert Julian directed this film late in his fading career, following it up with his final picture The Cat Creeps (1930), another lost film.

Cast
 Jacqueline Logan as Paula 
 Alan Hale as Caesar 
 Robert Armstrong as Chris 
 Hedwiga Reicher as Fran Holweg 
 James Bradbury Sr. as Herman Berlitz 
 Richard Alexander as Hector - Lion Tamer 
 William P. Burt as Presner 
 Sylvia Ashton as Mama Lolita 
 Kay Deslys as Austrian Maid 
 Willie Mae Carson as Austrian Maid

References

Bibliography
 Munden, Kenneth White. The American Film Institute Catalog of Motion Pictures Produced in the United States, Part 1. University of California Press, 1997.

External links
 

1928 films
1928 drama films
American silent feature films
American drama films
Films directed by Rupert Julian
American black-and-white films
Pathé Exchange films
1920s English-language films
1920s American films
Silent American drama films